Donald Gunn MacRae (20 April 1921 – 23 December 1997) was a British sociologist.

MacRae was born in Glasgow on 20 April 1921, and raised there and on the Isle of Skye, where his grandparents lived. His father Donald MacRae was an engineer who worked for a flour mill, and his mother Elizabeth Maud (Gunn) MacRae was a teacher. He attended the University of Glasgow, followed by the Balliol College, Oxford. Upon attaining first-class honours in philosophy, politics and economics, MacRae joined the London School of Economics faculty in 1945, as an assistant lecturer. He was promoted to lecturer in 1950, and appointed reader in 1954. MacRae made professor in 1961, and was named Martin White Professor of Sociology in 1978, succeeding David Glass. Upon retirement in 1987, MacRae gained emeritus status.

MacRae was married twice, first to Helen McHardy in 1948. They had two daughters before the marriage was dissolved. MacRae then married Jean Ridyard in 1987, with whom he raised one daughter and one son. MacRae died on 23 December 1997, in Canterbury.

References

1921 births
1997 deaths
British sociologists
Alumni of the University of Glasgow
Alumni of Balliol College, Oxford
Academics from Glasgow
20th-century social scientists
Academics of the London School of Economics